IEP may refer to:

Science and technology 
 Immunoelectrophoresis
 Inclusion–exclusion principle
 Integrated electric propulsion
 Isoelectric point

Education and research 
 Individualized Education Program, in the United States
 Instituts d'études politiques (Institutes of Political Studies)
 Institute for Economics and Peace
 Institute for European Politics
 Institute for Political Studies – Catholic University of Portugal
 Internet Encyclopedia of Philosophy

Other uses 
 Icahn Enterprises, an American conglomerate
 Institute of Employability Professionals, a British professional association
 Intercity Express Programme, a British rail transport initiative
 Irish pound